Thórarinn Ingi Thorsteinsson (24 February 1930, Reykjavík – 23 March 2006, Fossvogur) was an Icelandic track athlete who specialized in hurdling and sprinting. He participated in the 1952 Summer Olympics in Helsinki in the 110 meter hurdles, 400 meter hurdles and 4 x 100 meter relay.

References

ÞÓRARINN INGI ÞORSTEINSSON, MBL 

1930 births
2006 deaths
Ingi Thorsteinsson
Ingi Thorsteinsson
Athletes (track and field) at the 1952 Summer Olympics
Ingi Thorsteinsson